The British Business and General Aviation Association (BBGA) is a non-profit corporation based in the United Kingdom, and is the UK's National Trade Body representing companies operating and trading in the General & Business Aviation Industry.

History
The association has existed in its current form since August 2004, when the General Aviation Manufacturers & Traders Association (GAMTA), which was based at Brill near Aylesbury, merged with the Business Aviation Users Association (BAUA), whose Chief Executive was Derek Leggett then John Batty from June 2003, which was based in Farnborough. Mark Wilson became CEO of the merged organisation.

The BAUA was mostly concerned with technical requirements for aircraft.

Aims
BBGA aims to create an environment that fosters business aviation in the UK and around the world, and its member companies span all facets of the business aviation sector.

Structure
BBGA is currently headed by its chairman Aoife O' Sullivan, and CEO Marc Bailey. It represents about 180 companies, including airports, corporate flight departments and plane manufacturers. The organisation is based in Dorton, Aylesbury, Bucks.

See also
 Joint Aviation Authorities (JAA)
 European Business Aviation Association (EBAA)

References

External links
 British Business and General Aviation Association

Aviation organisations based in the United Kingdom
Organizations established in 2004
Organisations based in Buckinghamshire
2004 establishments in the United Kingdom